Haile is an unincorporated community in Alachua County, Florida, United States.

Geography

References

Unincorporated communities in Alachua County, Florida
Unincorporated communities in Florida